The Journal of Orthopaedic Research is a peer-reviewed medical journal of orthopaedics published by Wiley-Liss on behalf of the Orthopaedic Research Society. It was established in 1983 and the editor-in-chief is Linda J. Sandell (Washington University in St. Louis). According to the Journal Citation Reports, the journal has a 2020 impact factor of 3.494, ranking it 19th out of 82 journals in the category "Orthopedics".

References

External links 
 

Publications established in 1983
Orthopedics journals
Wiley-Liss academic journals
English-language journals
Monthly journals